Esplanaden may refer to:
 Esplanadi, a park in Helsinki, Finland
 Esplanaden, Copenhagen, a street in Copenhagen, Denmark

See also 
 Esplanade (disambiguation)
 Esplanada (disambiguation)